Girls of the Big House is a 1945 American drama film directed by George Archainbaud and starring Lynne Roberts, Virginia Christine and Marion Martin.

The film's sets were designed by the art director Gano Chittenden.

Plot
A college professor's daughter is convicted of a crime she didn't commit. Under an assumed name, Jeanne Crail, she is imprisoned with inmates including Bernice Meyers, who misses her boyfriend Smiley, and the condemned Alma Vlasek, who killed a policeman while waiting to ambush her cheating husband and his mistress.

Jeanne breaks out of jail to go see her sweetheart, lawyer Bart Sturgis. When her man Smiley visits prison, Bernice is infuriated by his attraction to Jeanne and attacks her with a knife. Jeanne ends up in solitary confinement. Alma, finally realizing who her husband's secret lover was, murders Bernice in the prison. Bart's efforts help clear Jeanne's name and win her release.

Cast
 Lynne Roberts as Jeanne Crail  
 Virginia Christine as Bernice Meyers  
 Marion Martin as Dixie  
 Adele Mara as Harriet  
 Tom Keene as Barton Sturgis  
 Geraldine Wall as Head Matron Marsden  
 Tala Birell as Alma Vlasek  
 Norma Varden as Mrs. Thelma Holt  
 Mary Newton as Dr. Gale Warren  
 Steve Barclay as Smiley Gordon 
 Erskine Sanford as Professor O'Neill  
 Sarah Edwards as Dormitory Matron  
 Ida Moore as 'Mother' Fielding  
 William Forrest as District Attorney  
 Verna Felton as Agnes  
 George Reynolds as Earl Williams  
 Dick Elliott as Felton  
 Hella Crossley as Mae  
 Kathryn Sheldon as Kitchen Warden 
 Isabel Withers as Alma's Cell Warden 
 Gertrude Astor as Railroad Matron 
 Roy Barcroft as Police Dispatcher (voice) 
 Barbara Bedford as Visitors' Matron 
 Barry Bernard as Scholar 
 Symona Boniface as Matron  
 Grace Cunard as Medical Trustee 
 Edythe Elliott as Postmistress  
 Dorothy Granger as Woman Clerk  
 John Ince as Pompous Man  
 Marjorie Kane as Inmate  
 Elaine Lange as Mabel  
 Tom London as Sheriff at Alma's Cell 
 Mary McCarty as Inmate  
 Anne O'Neal as Bart's Secretary  
 Florence Pepper as Clerk  
 Lee Phelps as Detective Benson  
 Mary Rockwell as Laundry Matron  
 Marin Sais as Foyer Matron
 Walter Shumway as Policeman
 Lee Slater as Yell Leader 
 Sheila Stewart as Trustee-Clerk  
 Brick Sullivan as Deputy Sheriff  
 Charles Sullivan as Waiter  
 Rean Tibeau as The Little Stoolie

References

Bibliography
 Vincent LoBrutto. The Encyclopedia of American Independent Filmmaking. Greenwood Press, 2002.

External links
 

1945 films
1945 drama films
American drama films
Films directed by George Archainbaud
Republic Pictures films
American black-and-white films
1940s English-language films
1940s American films